Main Street, U.S.A.  is the first "themed land" inside the main entrance of the many theme parks operated or licensed by The Walt Disney Company around the world. Main Street, U.S.A. is themed to resemble American small towns during the early 20th Century. In Tokyo Disneyland, it is called World Bazaar and covered by a glass Victorian-style conservatory roof to shield guests from the weather there. At Shanghai Disneyland, it is called Mickey Avenue and is orientated to help introduce visitors to Disney characters.

Each Main Street, U.S.A. (except in Tokyo and Shanghai) has a train station along the park's respective Disney railroad above the entrance. The area closest to the entrance, usually just past the train station, is called Town Square.

At the other end of Main Street stands the park's centrally located castle (Sleeping Beauty Castle at Disneyland in California, Cinderella Castle at Walt Disney World and Tokyo Disneyland, Le Château de la Belle au Bois Dormant at Disneyland Park in Paris, Castle of Magical Dreams at Hong Kong Disneyland, Enchanted Storybook Castle at Shanghai Disneyland). In most of the parks, the area in front of the castle is known as The Hub or Central Plaza, while Shanghai Disneyland has the Gardens of Imagination in place of a hub/central plaza. At the Hub/Central Plaza, one will find the entrances to most of the other lands at the parks.

Town Square is home to City Hall, in which the Guest Relations office is located. Further along Main Street, the names painted in the windows on Main Street serve as credits for some of the many people, Imagineers and others, who contributed in some way to the creation of Disneyland. Largely they appear as fictional businesses (gyms, realtors, dentists), and they often refer to a hobby or interest that the person honored. Ub Iwerks's window, for example, refers to his prowess with cameras.

Disneyland

Inspired by Walt Disney's hometown of Marceline, Missouri (as in the film Lady and the Tramp), Main Street, U.S.A. is designed to resemble the center of an idealized turn-of-the-20th-century American town.  According to Harper Goff, who worked on Main Street, U.S.A. with Walt, he showed Walt some photos of his childhood home of Fort Collins, Colorado.  Walt liked the look, and so many of the features of the town were incorporated into Main Street, U.S.A. Another significant source of inspiration for the Main Street, U.S.A. concept came from the Henry Ford Museum & Greenfield Village, which Walt Disney visited twice in the 1940s.

Walt Disney said, "For those of us who remember the carefree time it recreates, Main Street will bring back happy memories. For younger visitors, it is an adventure in turning back the calendar to the days of their grandfather's youth." Above the firehouse in Town Square at Disneyland is Walt Disney's personal apartment, fully furnished but off-limits to the public. A lamp is kept burning in the front window as a tribute to his memory, except at Christmas where a small tannenbaum replaces the lamp. It is largely decorated for both Halloween and Christmas.

There is a  Christmas tree during Christmas Time, and there is a  Mickey Mouse jack-o-lantern on Halloween Time, with additional pumpkin ears. In the circular hub in front of the Sleeping Beauty Castle, the bronze "Partners" statue of Walt Disney and Mickey Mouse is surrounded by smaller bronzes of familiar Disney characters, such as Donald Duck and the White Rabbit from Alice in Wonderland.

The Main Street Opera House in Town Square is the oldest building in Disneyland. It formerly served as the park's lumber mill between 1955 and 1961. The cannons that are displayed in the center of the square were used by the French army during the 1800s, although they were never fired in battle. The gas lamps that line the street originally came from St. Louis and were bought for $.03 a pound.

Partners, sculpted by Blaine Gibson, was added in 1993. During the Halloween season, pumpkin busts for each themed land in the park, except Main Street, are seen around "Partners." It is listed as a real street in the Orange County Thomas Guide.

For Disneyland's 50th anniversary, on July 17, 2005, a first-story window on each Main Street was unveiled with a dedication to all the cast members (employees) who had worked for Disney throughout the years. The streets are paved with resilient asphalt, a type of asphalt containing rubber, to prevent aching of feet. In July 2015, Disneyland expanded their Main Street U.S.A. with a Main Street Arcade in honor of their 60th anniversary.

Attractions and entertainment
 The Disney Gallery (2009–present)
 Disneyland Railroad (1955–present)
 Great Moments with Mr. Lincoln (1965–present)
 Main Street Cinema (1955–present)
 Main Street Vehicles (a  narrow gauge tramway with horse-drawn streetcars is part of this attraction)
 Main Street Arcade
 Magic Happens
 The Dapper Dans (1959–present)
 The Disneyland Band
 Halloween Screams (2009–present)
 Disney's Celebrate America (2008–present)
 Believe... In Holiday Magic (2000–present)
 Wondrous Journeys (2023–present)

Former attractions and entertainment
 Bandstand (1955–1962)
 Horse Drawn Fire Wagon (1955–1960) (Now parked inside the Fire House on Main Street)
 Main Street Shooting Gallery (1955–1962)
 Firehouse Five Plus Two (1955–1971)
 Horse Drawn Surrey (1955–1971)
 Carefree Corner (1956–1985; 1988–1994)
 Carnation Plaza Gardens (1956–2012)
 Babes in Toyland Exhibit (1961–1963)
 Legacy of Walt Disney (1970–1973)
 The Walt Disney Story (1973–1975)
 Disneyland Presents a Preview of Coming Attractions (1973–1989)
 Gift-Giver Extraordinaire Machine (1985)
 Dream Machine (1990)
 Party Gras Parade (1990)
 The World According to Goofy Parade (1992)
 Aladdin's Royal Caravan Parade (1993)
 The Lion King Celebration Parade (1994–1997)
 Dalmatian Celebration (1996–1997)
 Hercules Victory Parade (1997-1998)
 Light Magic (1997)
 Mulan Parade (1998 – October 1999)
 Parade of the Stars (2000–2005)
 Walt Disney's Parade of Dreams (2005–2008)
 Disneyland: The First 50 Magical Years (2005–2009)
 Celebrate! – A Street Party (2009–2010)
 Disney's Honorary VoluntEARS Cavalcade (2010)
 Paint the Night (2015–2016)
 Together Forever: A Pixar Nighttime Spectacular (2018)
 Mickey's Soundsational Parade (2011-2019)
 Disneyland Forever (2015-2016, 2019, 2022)
 Mickey's Mix Magic (2019; 2021-2022)
 Main Street Electrical Parade (1972–1996, 2017, 2019, 2022)

Restaurants and refreshments
 Carnation Café
 Gibson Girl Ice Cream Parlor
 Jolly Holiday Bakery
 Main Street Market House (sponsored by Starbucks)
 Plaza Inn (formerly the Red Wagon Inn)
 Refreshment Corner

Former restaurants
 American Egg House (1978–1983)
 Blue Ribbon Bakery (1990–2012)
 Carnation Ice Cream Parlor (1955–1997)
 Hills Bros. Coffee House & Coffee Garden (1958–1976)
 Main Street Cone Shop (2000–2014)
 Maxwell House Coffee Shop (1955–1957)
 Plaza Pavilion Restaurant (1955–1998)
 Puffin Bakery (1955–1960)
 Sunkist Citrus House (1960–1989)
 Town Square Cafe (1976–1978; 1983–1992)

Shops
 20th Century Music Company
 Candy Kitchen
 Candy Palace
 China Closet
 Crystal Arts
 Crystal Palace
 Disney Clothiers, Ltd.
 Disneyana
 Disney Showcase
 Emporium
 Main Street Magic Shop
 Main Street Pin Shop
 New Century Jewelry
 Newsstand
 Penny Arcade
 Silhouette Studio

Former shops
 Annual Pass Center (2005–2009)
 Bank of America (1955–1992)
 Bank of Main Street (1992–2005)
 Candle Shop (1958–1975)
 Card Corner (1985–1988)
 Coin Shop (1957–1960)
 Cole of California Swimsuits (1956–1957)
 Ellen's Gift Shop (1955–1956)
 Fine Tobacco (1955–1990)
 Flower Mart (1957–1995)
 GAF Photo Salon (1970–1984)
 Gallen-Kamp Stores Co. (1955–1957)
 Gibson Greeting Cards (1955–1959)
 Glass Blower (1955–1966)
 Grandma's Baby Shop (1955)
 Great American Pastimes (1991–1999)
 Hallmark Card Shop (1960–1985)
 Hurricane Lamp Shop (1972–1976)
 Intimate Apparel (1955–1956)
 Jemrock Shop (1955–1957)
 Jewelry Shop (1957–1986)
 Jimmy Starr's Show Business Souvenirs (1956–1959)
 Kodak Camera Center (1984–1994)
 Mickey Mouse Club Headquarters Shop (1963–1964)
 New Century Watches & Clocks (1972–2008)
 Patented Pastimes (1990–1991)
 Pen Shop (1955–1959)
 Polaroid Camera Center (1955–1970)
 Ruggles China & Glass Shop (1955–1964)
 Story Book Shop (1955–1980)
 Sunny-View Farms Jams & Jellies (1955–1957)
 Town Square Realty (1955–1960)
 Upjohn Pharmacy (1955–1970)
 Watches & Clocks (1955–1971)
 Wonderland Music (1960–1972)
 Wurlitzer Music Hall (1955–1968)
 Yale & Towne Lock Shop (1955–1964)
 Western Printing Book Shop (1980–1995)

Magic Kingdom

Instead of being a replica of a small Midwestern American town, Main Street at Walt Disney World features some stylistic influences from around the country, such as New England and Missouri.  This is most noticeable in the "four corners" area in the middle of Main Street where each of the four corner buildings represents a different architectural style.  There is also no Opera House as there is at Disneyland; instead there is the Exposition Hall. Main Street is lined with shops selling merchandise and food.

The decor is early-20th-century small-town America, inspired by Walt Disney's childhood and the film Lady and the Tramp. City Hall contains the Guest Relations lobby where cast members provide information and assistance. A real working barber shop gives haircuts. The Emporium carries a wide variety of Disney souvenirs such as plush toys, collectible pins, and Mickey-ear hats. Tony's Town Square and the Plaza Restaurant are sit-down restaurants.  Casey's Corner is at the end of Main Street and sells traditional American ball park fare including burgers and fries.

In the distance beyond the end of Main Street stands Cinderella Castle. Though only 189 feet (55m) tall, it benefits from a technique known as forced perspective. The second stories of all the buildings along Main Street are shorter than the first stories, and the third stories are even shorter than the second, and the top windows of the castle are much smaller than standard. The resulting visual effect is that the buildings appear to be larger and taller than they really are. Main Street is considered the "opening credits" for the Magic Kingdom. Visitors pass under the train station (the opening curtain), and then view the opening credits on the upper stories of the main street buildings.

Each window has a business name on it, such as "Seven Summits Expeditions, Frank G. Wells President"; each of these people has a connection to Disney.  The windows/credits are ordered as they would be for a movie. In addition to the bronze "Partners Statue" of Walt Disney and Mickey Mouse in front of Cinderella Castle; there is also the "Sharing the Magic Statue" of Roy O. Disney sitting with Minnie Mouse near the park's entrance.
Surrounding the "Partners Statue" at the central hub are several iconic Disney characters featured throughout the park.  These include Minnie, Donald, Br'er Rabbit, Goofy, Chip and Dale, etc.

Attractions and entertainment

 Casey's Corner Pianist
 City Hall
 Harmony Barber Shop
 Main Street Vehicles (includes: horseless carriage, fire engine, omnibus, and  narrow gauge horse-drawn streetcars)
 Town Square Theater
 Walt Disney World Railroad (1971–present)
 Disney Enchantment (October 1, 2021–April 2, 2023)
 Happily Ever After (Returning on April 3, 2023)
 Flag Retreat
 Citizens of Main Street
 Main Street Trolley Show
 Disney Festival of Fantasy Parade
Move It! Shake It! Mouskedanceit! Street Party

Former attractions and entertainment
Parades
 America on Parade (1975–1976)
 Main Street Electrical Parade (1977–1991, 1999–2001, 2010–2016)
 Mickey's 50th Birthday Parade (1978)
 Dumbo's Circus Parade (1979)
 Tencennial Parade (1981–1982)
 Mickey Mouse Character Parade (1983–1984)
 Donald's 50th Birthday Parade (1984)
 Mickey's Street Party (January 1985 – 1986)
 15 Years of Magic (1986–1987)
 All-America Parade (1987–1988)
 Mickey's All-American Birthday Parade (1988–1990)
 Disney Character Hit Parade (1989–1991)
 20th Anniversary "Surprise" Celebration Parade/Surprise Celebration (1991–1994)
 Mickey Mania (1994–1996)
 25th Anniversary "Remember the Magic" Parade/Disney's Magical Moments Parade (1996–2001)
 Share a Dream Come True (2001 – June 2006)
 Family Fun Day Parade (2006–2007)
 Disney Dreams Come True (July 2006 – 2009)
 Move It! Shake It! Celebrate It! Street Party (2009-2014
 Celebrate a Dream Come True Parade (2009 – January 2014)
 Move It! Shake It! Dance & Play It! Street Party (2014-2018)

Other attractions
 Penny Arcade (1971–1995)
 Main Street Cinema (1971–1998)
 Swan Boats (1973-1983)
 The Walt Disney Story (1973–1992)
 SpectroMagic (1991–1999, 2001–2010)
 VMK Central
 Dream Along with Mickey (November 2006 - April 2, 2016)
 Sorcerers of the Magic Kingdom (2012–2021)

Restaurants and refreshments
 Casey's Corner
 Crystal Palace
 Main Street Bakery featuring Starbucks Coffee
 Plaza Ice Cream Parlor
 Plaza Restaurant
 Tony's Town Square Restaurant

Shops
 The Chapeau
 Confectionery
 Crystal Arts
 Disney Clothiers
 Disney & Co.
 Emporium
 Main Street Athletic Club
 Main Street Cinema
 Main Street Gallery
 Uptown Jewelers

Tokyo Disneyland

The World Bazaar is the alternative of Main Street, U.S.A. It is covered by a glass Victorian-style conservatory roof to shield guests from the Japanese weather. Amongst others, World Bazaar features a 1950s American diner. World Bazaar features the most eateries out of the "Main Streets", with three table service restaurants (four including Club 33). There is also a larger side street called "Center Street" that runs across Main Street which exits on either side into Tomorrowland and Adventureland. This was the first "Main Street" that did not  have a train station (the other "Main Street" being in Shanghai Disneyland.) World Bazaar is also home to Tokyo Disneyland's Club 33.

Attractions and entertainment
 Bicycle Piano
 Omnibus
 Penny Arcade
 Sax Four
 Tokyo Disneyland Band

Former attractions and entertainment
 Main Street Cinema
 Fire Engine
 Horseless Carriage
 Sax Five
 The Disney Gallery
Welcome Flower Band（2016-2018）
 Zip'n Zoom Guided Tours（2016-2018）

Restaurants and refreshments
 Eastside Cafe
 Center Street Coffeehouse
 Restaurant Hokusai
 Ice Cream Cones
 Sweetheart Cafe
 Refreshment Corner
 Great American Waffle Company
 Club 33

Shops
 World Bazaar Confectionery
 Grand Emporium
 Main Street Daily
 Camera Center
 Town Center Fashions
 Harrington's Jewelry & Watches
 Pastry Palace
 Toy Station
 Magic Shop
 House of Greetings
 Silhouette Studio
 The Disney Gallery
 Disney & Co.
 The Home Store

Disneyland Park (Paris)

This street is themed slightly differently from the others; the decor is more 1920s than turn-of-the-century, though the buildings are almost identical to those in Florida, with influences from the flapper and ragtime eras and an emphasis on baseball culture and the rise of the automobile. Instead of horse-drawn trolleys and Victorian vehicles, plans originally featured trams to fit with the 1920s theme, but were scrapped.

Also, due to often cold, rainy weather in the area, the Imagineers compromised and offered covered walkways on either side of Main Street called "arcades".  There is the "Discovery Arcade" on the side closest to Discoveryland, and the "Liberty Arcade" on the side closest to Frontierland.  These provide access to all of the shops along the length of Main Street, while giving shelter from the weather.  They also provide a passageway when the street is crowded during parades and fireworks.

Attractions and entertainment
 Disneyland Railroad – Main Street Station (1992–present)
 Disney Illuminations (2016–present)
 Horse-Drawn Streetcars ( narrow gauge tramway)
 Main Street Vehicles
 Disney Stars on Parade (2017–present)
 Liberty Arcade (1992–present)
 Discovery Arcade (1992–present)

Restaurants and refreshments
 Walt's – An American Restaurant
 Plaza Gardens Restaurant
 Casey's Corner
 Victoria's Home-Style Restaurant
 Market House Deli
 Cable Car Bake shop
 Cookie Kitchen
 The Coffee Grinder
 The Ice Cream Company
 The Gibson Girl Ice Cream Parlour

Shops
 Plaza East & West Boutiques
 The Storybook Store
 Ribbons & Bows Hat Shop
 The Bixby Brothers
 Emporium
 Dapper Dan's Hair Cuts
 New Century Notions, replacing Town Square Photography as of 1 August 2014.
 Boardwalk Candy Palace
 Disney Clothiers, Ltd.
 Main Street Motors
 Harrington's Fine China & Porcelains
 Disneyana Collectibles
 Lilly's Boutique
 Disney & Co.

Hong Kong Disneyland

Inspired by the main street in Disneyland, the buildings of this Main Street are almost identical to those in Anaheim. Like other main streets, Hong Kong Disneyland's Main Street, U.S.A. serves as the entrance of the park. Plans originally featured a restaurant under the Hong Kong Disneyland Railroad station, but were scrapped due to budget reasons.

The decor is 20th-century small-town America from about the years 1890–1910. Though being very similar to Anaheim's main street, the story of this street is heavily influenced by European immigrants. Plaza Inn has the same exterior design as the one in Anaheim but its theme is about a wealthy American couple who traveled to Hong Kong, fell in love with its culture and cuisine, and returned to create a classical English eatery filled with all the decorations they collected on their journeys. The Market House Bakery was founded by a Viennese pastry chef who brought some of the world's most famous desserts and coffee cakes from the Austrian imperial court.

Instead of using stone as the major building material like other main streets, Main Street at Hong Kong Disneyland was built mainly of wood, which is rare in Hong Kong. There are no horse-drawn streetcars on this street, although tracks for the streetcars can be seen from early conceptual arts.

In early August 2008, The Disneyland Story presenting How Mickey Mouse Came to Hong Kong was closed. It was re-themed to Art of Animation on August 31. On January 21, 2011, a new shop named Center Street Boutique was opened. On August 21, 2012, a new shop named Victorian Collection was opened, between Emporium and Centennial Hall.

Attractions and entertainment
 Animation Academy (2007–present)
 Art of Animation (2007–present)
 The Annex
 "Disney Paint the Night" Nighttime Spectacular (2014–2020; returned in 2023)
 Flights of Fantasy Parade
 Hong Kong Disneyland Railroad - Main Street Station (2005–present)
 Main Street Entertainment
 Main Street Vehicles
 Meet Chip and Dale in Main Street
 Meet Daisy at Town Square
 Meet Donald at Town Square
 Meet Duffy and Friends at Main Street Cinema
 Meet Goofy in Main Street
 Meet Mickey and Minnie at Town Square
 Meet Pluto in Main Street
 Momentous (2022-present)

Past attractions and entertainment
 The Disneyland Story presenting How Mickey Mouse Came to Hong Kong (2005–2008, re-themed as Art of Animation)
 The Dapper Dans (2007–2008)
 Main Street Haunted Hotel (2007-2011)
 Turtle Talk with Crush (2008)
 Mickey's House (2008–2009)
 High School Musical: LIVE! (2008–2011, re-themed as Lightning McQueen "LIVE"!)
 Tinker Bell's Pixie Dusted Castle (2010–2011)
 "The Magic Continues" Preview Gallery (2011)
 Lightning McQueen "LIVE"! (2011)
 Graves Academy (2012–2014)
 Monsters University Administration Building (2013)
 "Disney In The Stars" Fireworks (2005–2018)
 Royal Princess Garden (2017–2019)
 Bibbidi Bobbidi Boutique (2017–2019)
 We Love Mickey! (2018-2020)

Restaurants and refreshments
 Market House Bakery
 Main Street Corner Cafe
 Main Street Market
 Plaza Inn
 Popcorn, Cotton Candy, Frozen Lollipops Cart
 Sandwiches, Coffee Corner

Shops
 Castle View Gifts
 Centennial Hall
 Center Street Boutique
 Emporium
 Flower St. Boutique
 Main Street Cinema: My Journeys with Duffy
 Main Street Sweets
 Silhouette Studio
 The Curiosity Shop
 Town Square Photo
 Town Square Sundries
 Victorian Collection

Former shops
 Crystal Arts
 Midtown Jewelry
 Newsstand

Shanghai Disneyland
Mickey Avenue, the entrance of the Shanghai Disneyland Park, is the park's equivalent to Main Street, U.S.A.. The area is inspired by the personalities of Disney cartoon characters such as Mickey Mouse, Minnie Mouse, Donald Duck, and Chip 'n' Dale, as well as Disney films including, Ratatouille, The Three Caballeros, and Lady and the Tramp. Avenue M Arcade, the largest gift shop in the park, is modeled after the Carthay Circle Theater. The Storytellers statue, which depicts a young Walt Disney and Mickey Mouse, is located at the end of Mickey Avenue and in front of the Gardens of Imagination.

Attractions and entertainment 
 Meet Minnie Mouse and Friends
 Shanghai Disneyland Band

Restaurants and refreshments 
 Il Paperino
 Mickey & Pals Market Café
 Remy's Patisserie

Shops 
 Avenue M Arcade
 Carefree Corner
 Sweethearts Confectionery
 Whistle Stop Shop

See also 

 Rail transport in Walt Disney Parks and Resorts
 Tony Baxter

References

 
1955 establishments in California
1971 establishments in Florida
1983 establishments in Japan
1992 establishments in France
2005 establishments in Hong Kong
2016 establishments in China
Disneyland
Disneyland Park (Paris)
Heritage streetcar systems
Hong Kong Disneyland
Horse-drawn railways
Horse-drawn trams in operation
Magic Kingdom
Rail transport in Walt Disney Parks and Resorts
Themed areas in Walt Disney Parks and Resorts
Tokyo Disneyland
Nostalgia in the United States
Ersatz downtowns